Bengt Nordwall (born 1 June 1941) is a Swedish former freestyle swimmer. He competed at the 1960 Summer Olympics and the 1964 Summer Olympics.

References

External links
 

1941 births
Living people
Swedish male freestyle swimmers
Olympic swimmers of Sweden
Swimmers at the 1960 Summer Olympics
Swimmers at the 1964 Summer Olympics
Swimmers from Stockholm